The legislative districts of Bukidnon are the representations of the province of Bukidnon in the various national legislatures of the Philippines. The province is currently represented in the lower house of the Congress of the Philippines through its first, second, third, and fourth congressional districts.

History 

Prior to gaining separate representation, areas now under the jurisdiction of Bukidnon were represented under the Department of Mindanao and Sulu (1917–1935).

The voters of Bukidnon were finally given the right to elect their own representative through popular vote beginning in 1935 by virtue of Article VI, Section 1 of the 1935 Constitution.

During the Second World War, the Province of Bukidnon sent two delegates to the National Assembly of the Japanese-sponsored Second Philippine Republic: one was the provincial governor (an ex officio member), while the other was elected through a provincial assembly of KALIBAPI members during the Japanese occupation of the Philippines. Upon the restoration of the Philippine Commonwealth in 1945 the province retained its pre-war lone congressional district.

Bukidnon was represented in the Interim Batasang Pambansa as part of Region X from 1978 to 1984, and returned two representatives, elected at-large, to the Regular Batasang Pambansa in 1984.

Under the new Constitution which was proclaimed on February 11, 1987, the province was reapportioned into three congressional districts; each district elected its member to the restored House of Representatives starting that same year.

The approval of Republic Act No. 10184 on September 28, 2012 increased Bukidnon's representation by reapportioning the province into four congressional districts: the municipalities of Kalilangan and Pangantucan were segregated from the first district and the city of Valencia from the second district to form the new fourth district. The reconfigured districts elected their respective representatives beginning in the 2013 elections.

Current Districts

Historical Districts

Lone District (defunct) 

Notes

At-Large (defunct)

1943-1944

1984-1986

See also 
Legislative district of Mindanao and Sulu

References 

Bukidnon
Politics of Bukidnon